Yousef Al-Samoui is a Jordanian footballer who plays for Al-Hussein.

References

External links 
 
 jo.gitsport.net

1992 births
Living people
Jordanian footballers
Association football forwards
Al-Wehdat SC players
Al-Faisaly SC players
Al-Jazeera (Jordan) players
Al-Baqa'a Club players
Al-Hussein SC (Irbid) players